Akathethara  is a residential area in Palakkad city in the state of Kerala, India. It is located to 11 km towards North from District headquarters Palakkad and 5 km from renowned Malampuzha garden. Parts of Akathethara Panchayat is suppose to be part of the proposed Palakkad Municipal Corporation. Sabari Ashram also called as Kerala's Sabarmati is located here where Mahatma Gandhi made his visit three times.

Demographics
 India census, Akathethara had a population of 8190 with 4071 males and 4119 females.

References

Villages in Palakkad district
 
Suburbs of Palakkad
Cities and towns in Palakkad district